Edward Hugh James (14 April 1896 – 15 March 1975) was a Welsh cricketer.  James was a left-handed batsman who bowled slow left-arm orthodox. He was born at Briton Ferry, Glamorgan.

James made his debut for Glamorgan in the 1920 Minor Counties Championship against Cheshire.  He represented the county in 1 further Minor Counties fixtures in 1920, which came against Devon.  Glamorgan were elevated to first-class status in 1921 and in 1922, James made his first-class debut for the county against Lancashire. James played 2 further first-class matches for the county in 1922 against Yorkshire and Nottinghamshire.  A bowler, he took 7 wickets at a bowling average of 29.85, with best figures of 4/79.

James died at the town of his birth on 15 March 1975.

Family
His son David also played first-class cricket for Glamorgan.

References

External links
Edward James at Cricinfo
Edward James at CricketArchive

1896 births
1975 deaths
Cricketers from Briton Ferry
Welsh cricketers
Glamorgan cricketers